The western nicator (Nicator chloris) is a species of songbird in the family Nicatoridae.

Description

It is very similar to the eastern nicator, but the sides of the face and crown are olive green. It is best identified by its range and some of its vocalizations.

Range
It is mainly native to the African tropical rainforest.

Habitat
It inhabits subtropical or tropical moist lowland forest and subtropical or tropical swamps. It prefers well-established secondary growth forest from 700 to 1,850 metres.

References

External links

western nicator
Birds of the African tropical rainforest
western nicator
Taxonomy articles created by Polbot